Events in 1940 in animation.

Events

January
 January 13: Tex Avery's The Early Worm Gets the Bird is first released, produced by Warner Bros. Cartoons.

February
 February 10: Puss Gets the Boot, the first Tom & Jerry cartoon, is first released by William Hanna, Joseph Barbera and Rudolf Ising and produced by MGM. It marks the debut of Tom Cat, Jerry Mouse and Mammy Two Shoes.
 February 23: Pinocchio is first released, directed by Ben Sharpsteen and Hamilton Luske, produced by Walt Disney Animation Studios. It marks the debut of Jiminy Cricket, who will appear in various other Disney-related media. 
 February 29: 12th Academy Awards: The Ugly Duckling, produced by Walt Disney Animation Studios, directed by Jack Cutting and Clyde Geronimi, wins the Academy Award for Best Animated Short Film.

March
 March 2: Chuck Jones' Elmer's Candid Camera is first released, produced by Warner Bros. Cartoons. In this cartoon Elmer Fudd makes his debut, though he has a different appearance, resembling earlier character Egghead. An unnamed rabbit, who is a prototypical version of Bugs Bunny, also plays a starring role.

May
 May 16: Wagorō Arai's Madame Butterfly's Illusion premieres.

June
 June 7: Jack King's Donald Duck short Mr. Duck Steps Out, produced by the Walt Disney Animation Studios, premieres, in which Donald goes out dancing with Daisy Duck, only to be bothered by Huey, Louie and Dewey.
 June 22: Rudolf Ising's The Milky Way, produced by MGM Animation, makes its debut.

July
 July 27: Tex Avery's A Wild Hare premieres, produced by Warner Bros. Cartoons, marks the official debut of Bugs Bunny and Elmer Fudd. It's also the first time Bugs asks: "What's up, Doc?" and Elmer asks people to be quiet, because he's hunting "wabbits".

August
 August 9: Jack King's Donald Duck short Donald's Vacation, produced by Walt Disney Animation Studios, premieres.

September
 September 20: Jack King's Donald Duck short Window Cleaners, produced by Walt Disney Animation Studios, premieres.

November
 November 1: Clyde Geronimi's Mickey Mouse and Pluto cartoon Mr. Mouse Takes a Trip, produced by Walt Disney Animation Studios, premieres.
 November 2: Bob Clampett's The Sour Puss premieres, produced by Warner Bros. Cartoons. It marks the first time the Acme Corporation running gag is used.
 November 13: Samuel Armstrong, James Algar, Bill Roberts, Paul Satterfield, Ben Sharpsteen, David D. Hand, Hamilton Luske, Jim Handley, Ford Beebe, T. Hee, Norman Ferguson and Wilfred Jackson's Fantasia, produced by the Walt Disney Animation Studios, is first released. It becomes a box office flop, received mixed reviews, but will gain cult film status decades later.
 November 25: Walter Lantz's animated short Knock Knock premieres, produced by Walter Lantz Productions which marks the debut of Woody Woodpecker.

December
 December 7: Tex Avery's Of Fox and Hounds premieres, produced by Warner Bros. Cartoons, in which Willoughby the Dog makes his debut. It also marks the first use of "Which way did he go, George? Which way did he go?" in animated cartoons.

Specific date unknown
 John Halas and Joy Batchelor establish the animated studio Halas and Batchelor. 
 Mary Ellen Bute's Tarantella premieres.
 The Jam Handy Organization makes the live-action educational short A Case of Spring Fever to promote springs and their importance. The film features some animation. Five decades later, it would gain cult fame after featuring in the TV show Mystery Science Theater 3000.
 British radio comedian Harry Hemsley makes an animated advertising short where the characters from his radio show and comic strip Ovaltiney's Concert Party appear, all voiced by himself.

Films released

 February 7 - Pinocchio (United States)
 November 13 - Fantasia (United States)

Births

January
 January 1: Ippei Kuri, Japanese manga artist (Science Ninja Team Gatchaman).
 January 19: Linda Sorenson, Canadian voice actress (voice of Pretty Bit in Popples, Fifi in Beverly Hills Teens, Miss Grundy in The New Archies, Demeter in Mythic Warriors, Hetty King in Anne of Green Gables: The Animated Series, Old Woman in Barbie & the Diamond Castle, Old Lady Munson in Kid vs. Kat).
 January 22: John Hurt, English actor (voice of Aragorn in The Lord of the Rings, Hazel in Watership Down, Snitter in The Plague Dogs, the Horned King in The Black Cauldron), (d. 2017).
 January 27: James Cromwell, American actor (voice of the Colonel in Spirit: Stallion of the Cimarron, Robert Callaghan / Yokai in Big Hero 6 and Big Hero 6: The Series).

February
 February 2: David Jason, English actor and comedian (voice of the title characters in Danger Mouse and Count Duckula, Mr. Toad in The Wind in the Willows, and subsequent TV series).
 February 4: John Schuck, American actor (voice of Reptar and Leo in the Rugrats episode "Reptar on Ice", Arms Akimbo in the Freakazoid! episode "In Arm's Way", Wally and Announcer in the Hey Arnold! episode "Ransom").
 February 11: Lord Tim Hudson, English DJ and voice actor (voice of Dizzy in The Jungle Book, Hit Cat in The Aristocats), (d. 2019).
 February 21: John Lewis, American politician and civil rights activist (voiced himself in the Arthur episode "Arthur Takes a Stand"), (d. 2020).
 February 28: Mario Andretti, Italian-born American former racing driver (voice of himself in Cars, Indianapolis Motor Speedway Traffic Director in Turbo, Mario Mousedretti in the Mickey and the Roadster Racers episode "Mickey's Speed Grand Prix").

March
 March 1: Robert Grossman, American painter, caricaturist, sculptor, filmmaker, poster designer, comics artist, cartoonist and animator (Jimmy The C), (d. 2018).
 March 11: William Callaway, American voice actor (voice of Aquaman and Bizarro in Super Friends, Clumsy Smurf in The Smurfs, Comet Guy in Darkwing Duck).
 March 26: James Caan, American actor (voice of Tim Lockwood in Cloudy with a Chance of Meatballs and Cloudy with a Chance of Meatballs 2, the Bamboo Cutter in The Tale of the Princess Kaguya, himself in The Simpsons episode "All's Fair in Oven War", and the Family Guy episode "Something, Something, Something, Dark Side"), (d. 2022).
 March 27: Austin Pendleton, American actor, playwright, theatre director, and instructor (voice of Gurgle in Finding Nemo and Finding Dory).
 March 30: Paul Driessen, Dutch film director, animator and writer (The Killing of an Egg, The Boy Who Saw the Iceberg).

April
 April 15: Thea White, American voice actress (voice of Muriel Bagge in Courage the Cowardly Dog and Straight Outta Nowhere: Scooby-Doo! Meets Courage the Cowardly Dog), (d. 2021).
 April 17: Chuck Menville, American animator and writer (Hanna-Barbera, Tiny Toon Adventures, Batman: The Animated Series), (d. 1992).
 April 21: George DiCenzo, American actor (voice of Hordak in She-Ra: Princess of Power, the title character in Blackstar), (d. 2010).

May
 May 4: Seán Barrett, English actor (voice of Asterix in The Twelve Tasks of Asterix, Melchoir in Lapitch the Little Shoemaker, Roly the Pineapple in The Fruities, additional voices in Asterix and the Big Fight).
 May 5: Lance Henriksen, American actor (voice of Kerchak in the Tarzan franchise, Lockdown in Transformers: Animated, General Tesler in Tron: Uprising, Mobius Quint in Super Robot Monkey Team Hyperforce Go!, Kobra Leader in the Static Shock episode "Future Shock").
 May 8: Emilio Delgado, Mexican-American actor (portrayed Luis in Sesame Street, voice of the King in The Bravest Knight, the Ram in the Between the Lions episode "The Ram in the Pepper Patch"), (d. 2022).
 May 9: James L. Brooks, American director, producer and screenwriter (The Simpsons).
 May 10: Taurean Blacque, American actor (voice of Roscoe in Oliver & Company), (d. 2022).

June
 June 1: René Auberjonois, American actor (voice of Chef Louis in The Little Mermaid, the Skull in The Last Unicorn, DeSaad in Super Friends, Mark Desmond in Young Justice, Azmuth in Ben 10: Omniverse, Ebony Maw in Avengers Assemble), (d. 2019).
 June 6: Richard Paul, American voice actor (voice of Sonny in Coonskin), (d. 1998).
 June 7:
 Monica Evans, English actress (voice of Abigail Gabble in The Aristocats, Maid Marian in Robin Hood).
 Tom Jones, Welsh singer (voice of Theme Song Guy in The Emperor's New Groove, himself in The Simpsons episode "Marge Gets a Job" and the Duck Dodgers episode "Talent Show A Go-Go", performed the theme song of Duck Dodgers).
 June 15:
 Michael Barrier, American animation historian.
 Aron Kincaid, American actor (voice of Killer Croc in Batman: The Animated Series, Fritter O'Way in DuckTales, Sky Lynx in The Transformers, the Nerdator in the Freakazoid! episode "Nerdator"), (d. 2011).
 June 20: John Mahoney, English actor (voice of Preston Whitmore in Atlantis: The Lost Empire and Atlantis: Milo's Return, General Rogard in The Iron Giant, Papi in Kronk's New Groove, Robert Terwilliger in The Simpsons episode "Funeral for a Fiend"), (d. 2018).
 June 28: Marilyn Lightstone, Canadian actress and writer (voice of Sonja and Grandma in Heathcliff, Crasher in Challenge of the GoBots, Alice Mitchell and Martha Wilson in Dennis the Menace).
 June 30: Félix Nakamura, Peruvian animator and film director, (d. 2000).

July
 July 6: Milan Blažeković, Croatian animator (The Elm-Chanted Forest, The Magician's Hat, Lapitch the Little Shoemaker), (d. 2019).
 July 7: Ringo Starr, English musician, singer, songwriter and actor (voice of Narrator/Father in The Point!, the Narrator in seasons 1 and 2 of Thomas & Friends, Fibonacci Sequins in The Powerpuff Girls: Dance Pantsed, himself in The Simpsons episode "Brush with Greatness").
 July 11: Toby Bluth, American illustrator, theatrical director, animator and background artist (Walt Disney Animation Studios, Hanna-Barbera, Banjo the Woodpile Cat, Mickey, Donald, Goofy: The Three Musketeers) and brother of Don Bluth, (d. 2013).
 July 13: Patrick Stewart, English actor (voice of Number One in The Simpsons, Avery Bullock in American Dad!, Adventure in The Page Master, Seti in The Prince of Egypt, King Goobot in Jimmy Neutron: Boy Genius, Mr. Woolensworth in Chicken Little, Lord Yupa in Nausicaa of the Valley of the Wind, the Great Prince of the Forest in Bambi II, Max Winters in TMNT, Poop in The Emoji Movie, Jean-Luc Picard and himself in Family Guy).
 July 18: James Brolin, American actor (voice of Emperor Zurg in Lightyear). 
 July 22: Alex Trebek, Canadian-American game show host and television personality (voice of Alan Quebec in the Rugrats episode "Game Show Didi", Announcer in The Magic School Bus episode "Shows and Tells", Alex Lebek in the Arthur episode "Arthur and the Big Riddle", voiced himself in The Simpsons episodes "Miracle on Evergreen Terrace" and "Penny-Wiseguys", the Pepper Ann episodes "Unhappy Campers" and "The Finale", the Family Guy episode "I Take Thee Quagmire", and the Scooby-Doo and Guess Who? episode "Total Jeopardy!"), (d. 2020).
 July 28: Philip Proctor, American comedian and actor (voice of Electro in Spider-Man, Charles' Father in The Tick, Howard DeVille in Rugrats, King Gerard in The Smurfs).

August
 August 1: Co Hoedeman, Dutch-Canadian filmmaker (The Sand Castle).
 August 3: Martin Sheen, American actor (voice of Sly Sludge in Captain Planet and the Planeteers, Gaspar in The 3 Wise Men, Emilio in Wrinkles, Grandfather James Alden in The Boxcar Children and The Boxcar Children: Surprise Island, Sgt. Seymour Skinner in The Simpsons episode "The Principal and the Pauper").
 August 26: Don LaFontaine, American voice actor (voice of the Narrator in Santa vs. the Snowman 3D, the Announcer in Fillmore!, FOX Announcer and Narrator in the Family Guy episodes "Screwed the Pooch" and "Brian Sings and Swings", Movie Trailer Announcer in the American Dad! episode "Tearjerker", Movie VO Voice in the Phineas and Ferb episode "The Chronicles of Meap"), (d. 2008).
 August 27: Sonny Sharrock, American jazz guitarist and composer (Space Ghost Coast to Coast), (d. 1994).

September
 September 8: Jack Prelutsky, American poet (voiced himself in the Arthur episode "I'm a Poet").
 September 12: Skip Hinnant, American voice actor (voice of Fritz the Cat in Fritz the Cat and The Nine Lives of Fritz the Cat, Sunny the Easter Bunny in The Easter Bunny is Comin' To Town, Pogo in I Go Pogo).
 September 19: Paul Williams, American composer, singer, songwriter, and actor (wrote and sang "Flying Dreams" in The Secret of NIMH, voice of Penguin in the DC Animated Universe, Garen in The Pirates of Dark Water, Hierophant in Adventure Time, Professor Williams in the Dexter's Laboratory episode "Just an Old Fashioned Lab Song").
 September 25:
 Roberto Del Giudice, Italian voice actor (dub voice of Arsène Lupin III in Lupin III), (d. 2007).
 Eva Švankmajerová, Czech painter, ceramist, poet, animator, designer, director and producer; also the wife of Jan Švankmajer, (d. 2005).

October
 October 1: Richard Corben, American animator, illustrator, comics writer, comics artist (Neverwhere, wrote the script for the Den segment in Heavy Metal) and colorist, (d. 2020).
 October 13: Dave Smith, American archivist (founder of the Walt Disney Archives) and author (Disney A to Z), (d. 2019).
 October 16: Barry Corbin, American actor (voice of Santa Claus in The Looney Tunes Show episode "A Christmas Carol", Fire Chief in the King of the Hill episode "A Fire-fighting We Will Go", Uncle Sammy in the Life with Louie episode "The Fourth Thursday in November").

November
 November 6: Jack Ong, American actor, writer, activist and marketing professional (voice of Chinese Fisherman in The Simpsons episode "Das Bus"), (d. 2017).
 November 20: Tony Butala, American singer (singing voice of Slightly in Peter Pan).
 November 21: Claudio Biern Boyd, Spanish television writer, director and producer (co-founder of BRB Internacional), (d. 2022).
 November 22:
 Terry Gilliam, American-born English animator (Monty Python's Flying Circus).
 Eiichi Yamamoto, Japanese animation director and screenwriter (Kimba the White Lion, Cleopatra, Belladonna of Sadness), (d. 2021).
 November 27: John Alderton, English retired actor (voice of the Narrator and other various characters in Little Miss and Fireman Sam, the title character and God in the Testament: The Bible in Animation episode "Jonah").

December
 December 1: Minori Matsushima, Japanese voice actress (voice of Dororo in Dororo, Sayaka Yumi in Mazinger Z, Hiroshi Ichikawa in The Monster Kid, Candice White Adley in Candy Candy, Alexandria Meat in Kinnikuman, Tsuru in One Piece), (d. 2022).
 December 11: Maggy Reno Hurchalla, American environmental activist (voice of Janet Reno in The Simpsons episode "Dark Knight Court"), (d. 2022).
 December 21: Frank Zappa, American rock artist and composer (voice of the Pope in The Ren & Stimpy Show episode "Powdered Toast Man", created background music for the first season of Duckman), (d. 1993).
 December 30: Jerry Granelli, American-Canadian jazz drummer (A Charlie Brown Christmas), (d. 2021).

Specific date unknown
 Orlando Corradi, Italian film animator and director (founder of Mondo TV), (d. 2018).
 Changiz Jalilvand, Iranian voice actor (dub voice of Bert in Mary Poppins), (d. 2020).
 Rick Hoover, American animator (Walt Disney Animation Studios, Hanna-Barbera, Filmation) and comics artist, (d. 1996).

Deaths

January
 January 21: Otis Harlan, American actor (voice of Happy in Snow White and the Seven Dwarfs), dies at age 74.

February
 February 15: Norman Spencer, American composer and songwriter (Warner Bros. Cartoons), dies at age 48.

July
 July 2: Guido Seeber, German film director, cinematographer and animator (Prosit Neujahr 1910!, the first German animated film), dies at age 61.

September
 September 2: Eddie Collins, American actor (voice of Dopey in Snow White and the Seven Dwarfs), dies at age 57.
 September 28: Earl Hurd, American animator, film director and comics artist (Bobby Bumps, worked for J.R. Bray, Terrytoons, Ub Iwerks and the Walt Disney Company), dies at age 60.

See also
List of anime by release date (1939–1945)

Notes

References

External links 
Animated works of the year, listed in IMDb

1940 in animation